WCHR-FM (105.7 MHz), known as "105.7 The Hawk", "Classic Rock for the Jersey Shore, 105.7 The Hawk" or in reverse "105.7 The Hawk, Classic Rock for the Jersey Shore", is a radio station in Manahawkin, New Jersey, with a classic rock format. It is owned by Townsquare Media.

Coverage area
WCHR-FM is the most powerful FM station in the Monmouth/Ocean market and can be heard as far west as the city of Philadelphia and Bucks County, Pennsylvania, as far north as Wall Township, New Jersey, and as far south as Ocean City.

The WCHR-FM antenna is co-located with 92.7 WOBM-FM and 104.1 W281CK on a tower located in Bayville.

History
On May 16, 1997 sign on the air as WAQB.

On December 19, 1997 the call letters were changed to WNJO.

WCHR-FM is not affiliated with WCHR, a Trenton radio station that currently broadcasts on 920 AM with a religious format; however, both stations were formerly owned by Nassau Broadcasting.

The WCHR call letters were originally associated with the Trenton station broadcasting at 94.5 FM, using a religious format (CHR standing for Christian Radio). In February 1998, WCHR began simulcasting on 920 AM, and on March 2, 1998, 94.5 FM changed callsigns to WNJO as it changed format to oldies. For more on the 94.5 frequency, see the WPST page.

105.7 was a construction permit that Nassau acquired in 1998. When WCHR's religious unit moved to AM 920 from 94.5 FM, the permit on 105.7 picked up the WCHR-FM call letters. 105.7 never employed the religious format. It did not sign on until 2000.  On march 14, 2002, WCHR-FM with simulcast of 98.5 WBBO.  On April 15, 2002, 98.5 WBBO ended simulcast. 105.7 The Hawk is sign-on the airwaves. The first song played was "Born in the U.S.A." by Bruce Springsteen. The under general manager Don Dalesio and Nassau's vice president of programming Michelle Stevens, Nassau originated The Hawk exclusively for the Jersey Shore. They brought in veteran program director Jim Spector who, in turn, hired The Free Beer and Hot Wings Morning Show. Nassau gave Millennium Radio the option to buy the station in the deal that transferred the ownership of WJLK-FM, WOBM-FM, WBBO-FM, WADB and WOBM in June 2002. Nassau operated WCHR until its sale was completed a year later in July 2003.

In 2010, 105.7 the Hawk agreed to broadcast all regular season New York Jets football games.

The Hawk began broadcasting from a new facility in downtown Toms River on January 30, 2013.

References

External links

CHR-FM
Classic rock radio stations in the United States
Radio stations established in 1998
Stafford Township, New Jersey
Townsquare Media radio stations
1998 establishments in New Jersey